Soulby is a civil parish in the Eden District, Cumbria, England.  It contains eight listed buildings that are recorded in the National Heritage List for England.  All the listed buildings are designated at Grade II, the lowest of the three grades, which is applied to "buildings of national importance and special interest".  The parish contains the village of Soulby and the surrounding countryside.  All the listed buildings are in the village, and consist of a church, a bridge, a farmhouse and associated structures, a house, and a commemorative pump.


Buildings

References

Citations

Sources

Lists of listed buildings in Cumbria